Ertuğrul Erdoğan (born October 18, 1968) is a Turkish professional basketball coach. He is the current head coach of Śląsk Wrocław of the Polish Basketball League and EuroCup.

Coaching career

First years 
In 1996, Erdogan began his professional level coaching career with Galatasaray.

Erdoğan later served as an assistant coach for the Fenerbahçe from 2000 to 2013. With Fenerbahçe, Erdoğan worked under legendary coaches Aydın Örs and Bogdan Tanjevic.

During the 2009–2010 season, coach Tanjevic was diagnosed  with colorectal cancer and left the team at late March, Erdogan took over and led Fenerbahçe to the 2009-10 Turkish Basketball League championship. Despite his success against the title favourites Efes Pilsen, he was not appointed as Fenerbahçe's head coach in the following season. Erdogan continued to serve in an assistant coach capacity with head coaches Neven Spahija and Simone Pianigiani in the following seasons. He left Fenerbahce in 2013, after 13 years.

Žalgiris Kaunas' interest 
Shortly after Sarunas Jasikevicius' decision to joining Barcelona in the summer of 2020, Ertugrul Erdogan has emerged the frontrunner for Zalgiris head coach position. Erdogan spoke with Zalgiris president and GM Paulius Motiejunas but there was never traction on reaching a contract agreement as the days wore on. Zalgiris opted to sign with the Salt Lake City Stars head coach, Martin Schiller.

A couple of days after Zalgiris' interest, on July 14, 2020, Galatasaray officially signed head coach Ertugrul Erdogan to a 1+1 contract extension, the team announced.

Galatasaray (2018–2020) 
On July 26, 2018, Erdogan signed a two-year contract, and agreed to become the new head coach of the Turkish club Galatasaray.

During his tenure at Galatasaray, Erdogan scouted and helped to promote many players into the Euroleague level. Rookies like Nigel Hayes, Aaron Harrison and Alex Poythress played under his leadership in their first seasons in Europe and then they signed with the Euroleague clubs Zalgiris, Olympiacos B.C and Zenit St. Petersburg respectively.

Zach Auguste, who was the starting center of Erdogan's Galatasaray for both seasons, agreed with Euroleague club Panathinaikos on July 20, 2020. Greg Whittington, another Galatasaray alum, "will sign with an NBA team, unless a major Euroleague team makes a strong offer"  according to Whittington's agent Jerry Dianis.

Galatasaray announced that the club has entered negotiations with head coach Ertugrul Erdogan for the mutual termination of his contract. On November 10, 2020, coach Erdogan bid his farewell to Galatasaray and their fans. “Without honesty, there is neither trust nor sustainable success. Thank you to everyone, mainly our fans, who supported me and my staff during my two and a half years at Galatasaray. My conscience is clear” he later tweeted.

Śląsk Wrocław (2023–present) 
On February 27, 2023, he signed a one-and-a-half year contract with Polish champions Śląsk Wrocław, who also competes in EuroCup.

Personal life 
Erdogan graduated from Middle East Technical University Department of Physical Education and Sports.

References

External links
 Ertuğrul Erdoğan at Galatasaray.org
 Ertuğrul Erdoğan at Eurobasket.com
 Ertuğrul Erdoğan at Euroleague.net

1968 births
Living people
Basketbol Süper Ligi head coaches
Fenerbahçe basketball coaches
Galatasaray S.K. (men's basketball) coaches
Turkish basketball coaches
Türk Telekom basketball coaches